Salt Rock (also Saltrock) is a census-designated place (CDP) in southern Cabell County, West Virginia, United States. As of the 2010 census, its population was 388. It lies along West Virginia Route 10 southeast of the city of Huntington, the county seat of Cabell County.  Its elevation is 581 feet (177 m).  Although Salt Rock is unincorporated, it has a post office, with the ZIP code of 25559. The community most likely was so named on account of there being a small-scale local salt manufacturing industry.

Notable person
 Ezra Midkiff – Major League Baseball player who played for the Cincinnati Reds (1909) and New York Yankees (1912-1913)

References

Census-designated places in Cabell County, West Virginia
Populated places on the Guyandotte River